The 1994 Yale Bulldogs football team represented Yale University in the 1994 NCAA Division I-AA football season.  The Bulldogs were led by 30th-year head coach Carmen Cozza, played their home games at the Yale Bowl and finished tied for fourth place in the Ivy League with a 3–4 record, 5–5 overall.

Schedule

References

Yale
Yale Bulldogs football seasons
Yale Bulldogs football